Frederiksberg is a borough in Copenhagen, Denmark.

Fredriksberg or Frederiksberg could also refer to several places:
 Frederiksberg, Sorø, Denmark, see Sorø Municipality#Locations
 Frederiksberg Municipality, a municipality in Copenhagen, Denmark
 Fredriksberg, Sweden, a town in Dalarna County, Sweden
 The old Swedish name for Pasila, a district in the Finnish capital Helsinki

See also
Fredericksburg (disambiguation), the name of several populated places in North America